Sareni is a village and corresponding community development block in Lalganj tehsil of Rae Bareli district, Uttar Pradesh, India. Historically the seat of a pargana, it is located 18 km from Lalganj, the tehsil headquarters, on the road to Daundia Khera in Unnao district. As of 2011, Sareni has a population of 4,819 people, in 792 households. It has 3 primary schools and no healthcare facilities. It serves as the headquarters of a nyaya panchayat which also includes 10 other villages.

History
Sareni was supposedly first founded by a member of the Bais clan named Sarang Sah. It was first made headquarters of a pargana and tehsil during the reign of Saadat Ali Khan (which one is not specified in the source). Previously, the pargana had been part of four different mahals: Kahanjara, Nisgar, Deorakh, and Tara Singhaur.

At the turn of the 20th century, Sareni had a police station, a post office, a cattle pound, and a large primary school. It was held in taluqdari tenure by the Rana of Khajurgaon, as part of the Murarmau estate. The population in 1901 was 1,458, including a Muslim minority of 202.

The 1951 census recorded Sareni as comprising 7 hamlets, with a total population of 1,466 people (779 male and 687 female), in 281 households and 149 245 houses. The area of the village was given as 1,197 acres. 153 residents were literate, 147 male and 6 female. The village was listed as belonging to the pargana of Sareni and the thana of Sareni.

The 1961 census recorded Sareni as comprising 5 hamlets, with a total population of 1,883 people (955 male and 928 female), in 334 households and 290 physical houses. The area of the village was given as 1,197 acres and it had a medical practitioner and post office at that point. It also had the following small industrial establishments: 1 grain mill, 1 maker of clothing, 2 makers of wooden products not further classified, and 1 maker of jewellery or precious metal items. The village's police staff consisted of 2 sub-inspectors, 1 head constable, and 14 constables.

The 1981 census recorded Sareni as having a population of 2,575 people, in 414 households, and having an area of 457.70 hectares. The main staple foods were given as wheat and rice.

The 1991 census recorded Sareni as having a total population of 3,419 people (1,777 male and 1,642 female), in 583 households and 583 physical houses. The area of the village was listed as 458 hectares. Members of the 0-6 age group numbered 707, or 21% of the total; this group was 56% male (396) and 44% female (311). Members of scheduled castes made up 19% of the village's population, while no members of scheduled tribes were recorded. The literacy rate of the village was 40% (950 men and 406 women). 919 people were classified as main workers (786 men and 133 women), while 2 people were classified as marginal workers (both women); the remaining 2,498 residents were non-workers. The breakdown of main workers by employment category was as follows: 280 cultivators (i.e. people who owned or leased their own land); 253 agricultural labourers (i.e. people who worked someone else's land in return for payment); 2 workers in livestock, forestry, fishing, hunting, plantations, orchards, etc.; 0 in mining and quarrying; 38 household industry workers; 66 workers employed in other manufacturing, processing, service, and repair roles; 4 construction workers; 133 employed in trade and commerce; 9 employed in transport, storage, and communications; and 134 in other services.

Villages
Sareni CD block has the following 160 villages:

References

Villages in Raebareli district
Community development blocks in India